Juergen Adams (born February 13, 1961) is a retired German professional ice hockey player.

Adams began his career in the school and youth teams of the Mannheimer ERC. In 1980, he came as a student to the professional team and was immediately with this German Hockey champion under coach Heinz Weisenbach. After another seven seasons for the Mannheimer ERC, he spent two years with the Eintracht Frankfurt before he ended his career as a professional after a year at EC Bad Nauheim in the 2nd Bundesliga . During his professional career Adams scored a total of 161 points, including 81 goals, in 356 games.

References

1961 births
Living people
Adler Mannheim players
Frankfurt Lions players
German ice hockey forwards
Sportspeople from Mannheim
Rote Teufel Bad Nauheim players